The Blade is the third studio album by American country music artist Ashley Monroe, released on July 24, 2015, through Warner Bros. Nashville. The album was produced by Vince Gill and Justin Niebank and includes the lead single "On to Something Good." The album made numerous "Best Albums of 2015" lists and was nominated for Best Country Album at the 58th Grammy Awards.

The title track was covered by Ronnie Dunn for his 2022 album 100 Proof Neon.

Promotion
In support of the album, Monroe toured with Little Big Town throughout the summer of 2015. Monroe then embarked on a headlining tour, "The Blade Tour," in the fall of 2015.

Promotional appearances in the media included a live performance of "Winning Streak" on The Tonight Show Starring Jimmy Fallon on July 27, 2015, "The Blade" on ABC's The View on August 6, 2015 and "I Buried Your Love Alive" on Conan on August 26, 2015.

Critical reception

The Blade received acclaim from music critics. At Metacritic, which assigns a normalized rating out of 100 to reviews from mainstream critics, the album has an average score of 86 out of 100, which indicates "universal acclaim" based on 14 reviews.

Rolling Stones Will Hermes gave the album four stars believing "The Blade dials it back...[for] You won't know whether to whoop or weep...It's a beautiful thing." Stephen Thomas Erlewine of AllMusic rated the album four and a half out of five stars and states: "She rolls easy, luxuriating in that exquisite sound, her soft touch making the heartbreak and the humor seem equally alluring." The four out of five star review Jewly Hight delivered for Billboard was for Monroe's ability to "sing these songs, many of which she co-wrote, with exquisite, bruised sensitivity." It was Spin'''s "album of the week," and in a seven out of ten rating Alfred Soto writes: "A couple of wooly moments aside, Monroe's third album, The Blade, continues a remarkable hot streak for writers Luke Laird, Jessi Alexander, Chris Stapleton, and Monroe herself." Robert Ham for Paste rated the album an 8.9 out of ten, succinctly sums-up the album, for being a "heartfelt and engaging" affair. This album got an A− from Nash Country Weekly, Tammy Ragusa realizes the release cements Monroe "as one of the premiere and rare female neo-traditionalists in the format." Sam C. Mac, gave the release an A− rating on behalf of The A.V. Club, informs the listener, "The majority of Monroe's superb third album hunkers down with heartache and struggle." Judging the album to be a B+ release, Glenn Gamboa writes for Newsday, asking a hypothetical question: "Monroe is still sorting out her own sound, but who can complain when that process is so compelling?" This album got an eight out of ten stars rating by PopMatters, Dave Heaton reminds it's not how many questions of pain with regards to the release, rather in hearing them, "they sound splendid." The release got a 7.5 out of ten from Pitchfork, Stephen M. Deusner marginally derides, "The Blade could be stronger if it was more streamlined and sequenced with some kind of overarching narrative in mind, but that's almost beside the point when the album sounds so damn good."

Meet-Country.com praised the album, in particular the title track, stating "“The Blade” is the crown jewel on the whole album. Although not penned by Ashley herself, she still took command on this one and sings it as if its one of her own. On the flip side, the narrator is the one who is still in love with someone who isn’t in love with them."

Accolades

Track listing

Personnel
Credits adapted from AllMusic.

Musicians

 Richard Bennett – electric guitar
 Tom Bukovac – electric guitar
 Eric Darken – percussion
 Charles Dixon – viola, violin
 Stuart Duncan – fiddle
 Paul Franklin – steel guitar
 Tony Harrell – keyboards, synthesizer
 Charlie Judge – Hammond B3, keyboards, strings, synthesizer
 Tim Lauer – keyboards
 Anthony LaMarchina – cello
 Paul Martin – background vocals
 Ashley Monroe – lead vocals
 Justin Niebank – acoustic guitar, electric guitar, keyboards, percussion
 Danny Rader – acoustic guitar, electric guitar, mandola
 Michael Rhodes – bass guitar
 Jimmie Lee Sloas – bass guitar
 Harry Stinson – background vocals
 Dan Tyminski – background vocals
 Charlie Worsham – background vocals
 Derek Wells – electric guitar
 Jeff White – background vocals
 Sarah Zimmermann – background vocals

Featured artists
 Fred Eltringham – drums
 Vince Gill – dulcimer, acoustic guitar, electric guitar, background vocals
 Alison Krauss – background vocals (track 12)
 Miranda Lambert – background vocals (track 5)
 Marty Stuart – background vocals

Technical personnel

 Drew Bollman – assistant, engineering
 Andrew Darby – assistant
 Steven Dewey – assistant
 Vince Gill – production
 Mike "Frog" Griffith – production coordination
 Adam Grover – assistant
 Cris Lacy – A&R
 Joseph Llanes – photography
 Justin Luffman – management
 Andrew Mendelson – mastering
 Mike Moore – art direction, design
 Justin Niebank – engineer, mixing, production
 Matt Rausch – assistant, engineer
 Shane Tarleton – creative director
 Brian David Willis – digital editing

Chart performanceThe Blade debuted at number 30 on the US Billboard 200 chart and number 2 on the Billboard'' Top Country Albums chart with 12,000 pure album sales during its first week of release. As of June 2016, the album has sold 38,600 copies in the US.

Album

Singles

Release history

References

2015 albums
Ashley Monroe albums
Warner Records albums